Inna Alexandrovna Gomes (born 2 January 1970) is a Russian actress and model, called "the best Russian model of November 2001" by Model Cast.

Biography
Was born in the village of Barakovo, Rybnovsky District, Ryazan Oblast, RSFSR, USSR. She lives in Moscow. In 1988, she became a finalist in the competition "Moscow Beauty". Worked as a model in «Red Stars» Agency, filmed in the advertisement for companies Zarina, Sweet Mama, Alix Avien, Deffinesse, PepsiCo. Married, has a daughter Maria, in 2002.

In late 2001, participated in the first season of the TV project "Last Hero" and Last Hero 1, Lost. After participating in a TV show he came to the Moscow Academy of Arts in the Department of Psychology (specialty "Psychology of advertising") and began to actively act in films and television series.

Filmography

References

External links

Photos, video
Inna Gomes at RUSKINO.RU
Inna Gomes at kino.ukr.net
Inna Gomes at rossfilm.ru
Inna Gomes at peoples.ru

1970 births
Living people
People from Rybnovsky District
Russian female models
Russian film actresses
Russian television actresses
Russian voice actresses
Soviet child actresses